Tarchonanthus is a genus of flowering plants in the mutisia tribe daisy family.

 Species
 Tarchonanthus camphoratus L. - Africa
 Tarchonanthus littoralis P.P.J.Herman - South Africa 
 Tarchonanthus minor Less. - South Africa
 Tarchonanthus obovatus DC. - South Africa
 Tarchonanthus parvicapitulatus P.P.J.Herman - South Africa
 Tarchonanthus trilobus DC. - South Africa
 formerly included

References

Mutisieae
Asteraceae genera
Taxa named by Carl Linnaeus